Wiley Maple (born May 25, 1990) is a former World Cup alpine ski racer from the United States, born and raised in Aspen, Colorado. He competed primarily in the speed events, downhill and super-G.

Maple paid his own way to the 2018 Winter Olympics, as he was not actually named to the U.S Olympic team. He competed in the men's downhill event.

References

External links
 
 
 
 
 Wiley Maple at U.S. Ski & Snowboard

1990 births
Alpine skiers at the 2018 Winter Olympics
American male alpine skiers
Living people
Olympic alpine skiers of the United States
Sportspeople from Aspen, Colorado